is a Japanese ski jumper.

In the World Cup his highest place was number 11 from January 2006 in Sapporo.

External links

1976 births
Living people
Japanese male ski jumpers